Romanov Empire may refer to:

 The Tsardom of Russia (1547-1721), ruled by the Romanov dynasty after 1613
 The Russian Empire (1721-1917)
 The House of Romanov, a European dynasty
 The Romanov Empire (micronation), est. 2011